is a Japanese superhero film released in theaters on January 30, 2010, featuring a crossover between the Samurai Sentai Shinkenger and Engine Sentai Go-onger casts and characters. The heroes of Tensou Sentai Goseiger also make a cameo appearance in the film. It opened at #5 its opening weekend and earned the equivalent of US$5 million. Its footage was used for the Power Rangers Samurai team up episode "Clash of the Red Rangers - The Movie".

Plot
However, after defeating EngineOh G9, Batcheed opens up a dimensional rift that sucks the Go-ongers and Engines to other Braneworlds. Soon after, while finding themselves fighting Ugatz, the Shinkengers encounter Go-on Red as he helps takes out the Ugatz on his own, much to the Shinkengers' shock. Soon after, the Shinkengers bring Sōsuke and Bomper to the Shiba House, but Takeru and Sōsuke are unable to work together due to their conflicting personalities. Elsewhere, Batcheed arrives onto the Rokumon Junk to make the Gedoushu an offer to hand him their waters to bring to the mortal realm in order to power his Batchrium Plant. With the Ayakashi Homurakogi supporting him, Batcheed then asks for Yogostein, Kitaneidas, and Kegalesia to support him. However, the trio raid the Gold Zushi cart before they tell the president they want nothing to do with his plan. They then ditch Shinken Gold as they retreat into the Sanzu River while he fights the Ugatz before Go-on Red and the other Shinkengers arrive to support him. The battle ends with the vassals getting sucked into a dimensional rift to save Shinken Red and Go-on Red from Batcheed's attack. While Genta and Mako meet the Sutō Siblings in Christmas World, Kotoha and Chiaki are jailed with Renn and Gunpei by DaiGoyou in Samurai World, and Ryunosuke ends up in Junk World alone until he is found by Saki and Hant as they cheer him up.

Back in the Human World, as Takeru and Sōsuke manage to resolve their differences, the two learn that Hikoma Kusakabe and Bomper have been kidnapped and are being held at Mount Aguruma where an entire army of Nanshi and Ugatz under Batcheed await them. However, when Takeru disregards the safety of the hostages for the sake of the world, Go-on Red is forced to fight Shinken Red. As Batcheed watches on that his enemies are fighting each other, he soon discovers that the fight is only a diversion to allow the Shishi Origami to help Jii and Bomper escape as the Engines arrive with the other Go-ongers and Shinkengers. Together, the two Super Sentai teams defeat the grunts while Shinken Red and Go-on Red take to the road to battle Homurakogi. Akumaro even attempts to get involved in the fight alongside Juzo and Dayu. However, they are prevented by an unfamiliar force claiming to be the 34th Super Sentai, Tensou Sentai Goseiger, who easily dispatches the three monsters. Giving Go-on Red the Kyoryu Disk so he can become Hyper Go-on Red as Shinken Red becomes Super Shinken Red, the two are joined by the others as they slay Homurakogi. Enlarging with his revived aide, Batcheed escapes to the Moon where the Batchrium Plant is, using Homurakogi as a shield to escape the Engine/Origami team attack as they form SamuraiHaOh and EngineOh G12 while he hooks himself up to his Batchrium Plant to achieve his full power. The two teams are powerless until the combinations reconfigure themselves into Samurai Formation 23 to destroy Batcheed before performing a victory clap. Soon after, the Go-ongers head off to the other Braneworlds to find any more surviving Gaiark officers, wishing the Shinkengers luck in keeping their world safe. In the ending theme, we get to see the Shinkenger's origami in "soul form" and Shinkenger's dance number in Samurai World.

Cast
 Takeru Shiba/Shinken Red: 
 Ryunosuke Ikenami/Shinken Blue: 
 Mako Shiraishi/Shinken Pink: 
 Chiaki Tani/Shinken Green: 
 Kotoha Hanaori/Shinken Yellow: 
 Genta Umemori/Shinken Gold: 
 Hikoma Kusakabe: 
 Juzo Fuwa: 
 Sōsuke Esumi/Go-on Red: 
 Renn Kōsaka/Go-on Blue: 
 Saki Rōyama/Go-on Yellow: 
 Hant Jō/Go-on Green: 
 Gunpei Ishihara/Go-on Black: 
 Hiroto Sutō/Go-on Gold: 
 Miu Sutō/Go-on Silver: 
 Kegalesia: 
 Child Santa: 
 Guard Santa: 
 Okappikki:

Voice actors
 Narrator, Sushi Changer, Inromaru: 
 DaiGoyou: 
 Doukoku Chimatsuri: 
 Dayu Usukawa: 
 Shitari of the Bones: 
 Akumaro Sujigarano: 
 Homurakogi: 
 Engine Speedor: 
 Engine Bus-on: 
 Engine BearRV: 
 Engine Birca: 
 Engine Gunpherd: 
 Engine Carrigator: 
 Engine Toripter: 
 Engine Jetras: 
 Engine Jum-bowhale: 
 Bomper: 
 Yogostein: 
 Kitaneidas: 
 Batcheed: 
 Gosei Red (Alata): 
 Gosei Pink (Eri): 
 Gosei Black (Agri): 
 Gosei Yellow (Moune): 
 Gosei Blue (Hyde): 
 Tensouder:

Theme song
 
 Lyrics: Shoko Fujibayashi and Mike Sugiyama
 Composition: Kenichiro Ōishi, YOFFY, and Hideaki Takatori
 Arrangement: Project.R (Kenichiro Ōishi)
 Artist: YOFFY, Sister MAYO, and Hideaki Takatori (Project.R)

Notes

References

External links
 

2010 films
2010s Super Sentai films
Crossover tokusatsu films
Martial arts science fiction films